Kuperbash (Küperbaş) is a rural locality (a village) in Novokainlykovsky Selsoviet, Krasnokamsky District, Bashkortostan, Russia. The population was 95 as of 2010. There is 1 street.

Geography 
Kuperbash is located 44 km southeast of Nikolo-Beryozovka (the district's administrative centre) by road. Sharipovskogo uchastka is the nearest rural locality.

References 

Rural localities in Krasnokamsky District